Cinetomorpha is a genus of goblin spiders first described by Eugène Louis Simon in 1892. It is a senior synonym of Lucetia, and Yumates.

Species
 it contains forty  one species:
C. adaga Ott & Bonaldo, 2019 – Colombia, Ecuador, Peru, Brazil
C. angela (Chamberlin, 1924) – Mexico
C. atlantica Ott & Brescovit, 2019 – Brazil
C. baja Ott & Ubick, 2019 – Mexico
C. bandolera Ott & Harvey, 2019 – USA, Mexico
C. boraceia Ott & Brescovit, 2019 – Brazil, Argentina
C. campana Ott & Harvey, 2019 – Chile
C. central Ott & Brescovit, 2019 – Brazil
C. chicote Ott & Bonaldo, 2019 – Colombia, Ecuador, Peru, Brazil
C. concepcion Ott & Harvey, 2019 – Chile
C. floridana (Banks, 1896) – USA
C. iguazu Ott & Brescovit, 2019 – Brazil, Argentina
C. itabaiana Ott & Brescovit, 2019 – Brazil
C. laguna Ott & Ubick, 2019 – Mexico
C. lavras Ott & Brescovit, 2019 – Brazil
C. longisetosa Ott & Harvey, 2019 – Costa Rica, Brazil
C. lorenzo Ott & Harvey, 2019 – Guatemala
C. loreto Ott & Bonaldo, 2019 – Peru
C. nayarit Ott & Harvey, 2019 – Mexico
C. nesophila (Chamberlin, 1924) – Mexico
C. orellana Ott & Bonaldo, 2019 – Ecuador
C. patquiana (Birabén, 1954) – Argentina
C. pauferro Ott & Brescovit, 2019 – Brazil
C. peluda Ott & Harvey, 2019 – Chile
C. pinheiral Ott & Brescovit, 2019 – Brazil
C. platensis (Birabén, 1954) – Argentina
C. pocone Ott & Brescovit, 2019 – Brazil
C. puberula Simon, 1893 – Trinidad and Tobago, Venezuela, Colombia
C. punctata Ott & Brescovit, 2019 – Brazil
C. quillota Ott & Harvey, 2019 – Chile
C. rinconada Ott & Harvey, 2019 – Chile
C. santamaria Ott & Brescovit, 2019 – Argentina
C. sedata (Gertsch & Mulaik, 1940) – USA
C. silvestris Simon, 1893 – Venezuela
C. similis Ott & Brescovit, 2019 – Brazil
C. simplex Simon, 1892 (type) – Mexico, USA and Caribbean to Argentina
C. sternalis Ott & Bonaldo, 2019 – Brazil
C. sur Ott & Ubick, 2019 – Mexico
C. vianai (Birabén, 1954) – Ecuador, Peru, Brazil, Argentina
C. waorani Ott & Bonaldo, 2019 – Ecuador, Peru
C. zero Ott & Harvey, 2019 – Mexico to Venezuela

See also
 Gamasomorpha
 Opopaea
 List of Oonopidae species

References

Further reading

Oonopidae genera
Taxa named by Eugène Simon